The Motorized-Armored Army Corps was a Royal Italian Army army corps established on 25 July 1943 led by general Giacomo Carboni.

History 
The corps was established after the deposition of Benito Mussolini and was formed with the most efficient divisions of the Royal Italian Army. The goal of the Corps was to defend Rome from an allied invasion, but after the signing of the Armistice of Cassibilein September 1943 its new task was to defend Rome from the Germans. After the Badoglio Proclamation units of the corps fought against German units, but due to the lack of orders from the highest political and militaries authorities the corps disbanded in the days following 11 September 1943.

Units 
 10th Infantry Division "Piave"
 21st Infantry Division "Granatieri di Sardegna"
 135th Armored Cavalry Division "Ariete"
 136th Armored Legionary Division "Centauro"

Other units
 18th Bersaglieri Regiment, from 9 September 1943 part of Centauro II division
 1st Fast Artillery Regiment
 1st Anti-aircraft Artillery Grouping
 11th Army Corps Engineer Grouping

References

Military units and formations established in 1943
Military units and formations disestablished in 1943
Army corps of Italy in World War II